The Symphony on a French Mountain Air, Op. 25, is written in 1886 by Vincent d'Indy.

As indicated by the title, d'Indy took the principal theme from a folk song he heard at Périer overlooking the Cévennes mountains (hence the work's alternative name, Symphonie cévenole).  Originally conceived as a fantaisie for piano and orchestra, the symphony is unusual in that it is scored for a prominent (but never dominant) piano part together with orchestra, and has acquired the label sinfonia concertante from some critics.

It consists of three movements and lasts just under half an hour:
Assez lent - Modérément animé
Assez modéré, mais sans lenteur
Animé
The symphony begins with an evocative melody played first by a cor anglais.  The main themes of subsequent movements are based on this melody, and as the symphony progresses each subsequent variation becomes more and more like the original version.

The work was dedicated to Marie-Léontine Bordes-Pène, who was the soloist at the premiere in Paris on March 20, 1887.

References

Further reading
Deruchie, Andrew. 2013. The French Symphony at the Fin de Siècle. New York: University of Rochester Press. . Chapter 5.

External links
Program notes by Paul Serotsky

Compositions by Vincent d'Indy
Romantic symphonies
1886 compositions
Compositions for piano and orchestra
Indy